Riding Donkeys on the Beach or The Donkey Ride is an Impressionist painting by the Dutch artist Isaac Israëls, now in the Rijksmuseum in Amsterdam, to which it was bequeathed from the Draker-Fraser private collection in London in 1944. The artist had stayed in a hotel at the Hague with his father Jozef Israëls during the summer from the mid-1890s onwards.

Sources
https://www.rijksmuseum.nl/nl/collectie/SK-A-3597

1898 paintings
1899 paintings
1900 paintings
Paintings by Isaac Israëls
Paintings in the collection of the Rijksmuseum
Paintings of children
Donkeys in art